Euchelus asper is a species of sea snail, a marine gastropod mollusk in the family Chilodontidae.

Description
The size of the shell varies between 6 mm and 35 mm. The thick, conoidal shell is imperforate in adult specimens. Its color is dull ashen, dotted with brown, rosy, and black. The 5½-6 convex whorls are  separated by profound sutures, the first one eroded, the rest rough. They are ornamented with close, granulose, unequal cinguli (the colored bands or spiral ornamentation), with two on the upper, and 3 or 4 on the body whorl more prominent. The penultimate whorl has 12-15 lirae. The globose body whorl is rounded, descending, and convex beneath. The aperture is ovate-rounded, the margins nearly continuous, plicated finely all around. The columella is arcuate. The base of the shell is dentate.

This species is highly variable. It is also known under the form Euchelus asper quadricarinatus (Holten, H.S., 1802) (synonym: Trochus alabastrum Reeve, 1858), common name the four-keeled margarite. The size of the shell varies between 6 mm and 12 mm. It is found in the Indo-Pacific.

Distribution
This species occurs in the Indo-West Pacific.

References

 Higo, S., Callomon, P. & Goto, Y. (1999) Catalogue and Bibliography of the Marine Shell-Bearing Mollusca of Japan. Elle Scientific Publications, Yao, Japan, 749 pp.
 Herbert D.G. (2012) A revision of the Chilodontidae (Gastropoda: Vetigastropoda: Seguenzioidea) of southern Africa and the south-western Indian Ocean. African Invertebrates, 53(2): 381–502.

External links
 To World Register of Marine Species
 Gastropods.com: Euchelus asper

asper
Gastropods described in 1791